The 2010 Top League Challenge Series was the 2010 edition of the Top League Challenge Series, a second-tier rugby union competition in Japan, in which teams from regionalised leagues competed for promotion to the Top League for the 2010–11 season. The competition was contested from 11 to 25 January 2010.

NTT Communications Shining Arcs and Toyota Industries Shuttles won promotion to the 2010–11 Top League, while Mazda Blue Zoomers and Yokogawa Musashino Atlastars progressed to the promotion play-offs.

Competition rules and information

The top two teams from the regional Top East League, Top West League and Top Kyūshū League qualified to the Top League Challenge Series. The regional league winners participated in Challenge 1, while the runners-up participated in Challenge 2.

The top two teams in Challenge 1 won automatic promotion to the 2010–11 Top League, while the third-placed team in Challenge 1 and the Challenge 2 winner qualified to the promotion play-offs.

Qualification

The teams qualified to the Challenge 1 and Challenge 2 series through the 2009 regional leagues.

Top West League

The final standings for the 2009 Top West League were:

 Toyota Industries Shuttles qualified for Challenge 1.
 NTT DoCoMo Red Hurricanes qualified for Challenge 2.

Top East League

The final standings for the 2009 Top East League were:

 NTT Communications Shining Arcs qualified for Challenge 1.
 Yokogawa Musashino Atlastars qualified for Challenge 2.

Top Kyūshū League

The final standings for the 2009 Top Kyūshū League were:

 Chugoku Electric Power, JR Kyūshū Thunders and Mazda Blue Zoomers qualified to the Second Phase.
 Mitsubishi Mizushima were relegated to lower leagues.

 Mazda Blue Zoomers qualified for Challenge 1.
 Chugoku Electric Power qualified for Challenge 2.

Challenge 1

Standings

The final standings for the 2010 Top League Challenge 1 were:

 NTT Communications Shining Arcs and Toyota Industries Shuttles won promotion to the 2010–11 Top League.
 Mazda Blue Zoomers progressed to the promotion play-offs.

Matches

The following matches were played in the 2010 Top League Challenge 1:

Challenge 2

Standings

The final standings for the 2010 Top League Challenge 2 were:

 Yokogawa Musashino Atlastars progressed to the promotion play-offs.

Matches

The following matches were played in the 2010 Top League Challenge 2:

See also

 2009–10 Top League
 Top League Challenge Series

References

2010 Challenge
2009–10 in Japanese rugby union
2010 rugby union tournaments for clubs